William Sheller (born William Desboeuf on 9 July 1946) is a French classical composer and singer-songwriter.

A prominent artist of French popular music since the 1970s, William Sheller has the particularity of being one of the few singers of French chanson who has benefited from a solid background in classical music. This has influenced his repertoire with a sophisticated musical style, combining elements of classical music with chanson and symphonic rock.

Biography
Born in Paris to an American soldier and a French mother, William Desboeuf was raised in Ohio until he was 7. He then went back to France to live with his mother's parents, who worked in the Théâtre des Champs-Élysées and the Palais Garnier. 
 
William left school at 16 to study composition with teacher Yves Margat (himself a student of Gabriel Fauré) and later harmony, fugue and counterpoint at the Paris conservatoire. He was training for the Prix de Rome but turned to pop music after hearing the Beatles. 
Since then, Sheller has had a successful career both as a classical composer and as a pop singer. His works often mix both genres. For example, some of his songs include carefully crafted orchestral passages (the Baroque introduction to Le nouveau monde) as well as instruments that are seldom found in pop music (such as a horn in Les miroirs dans la boue and a clarinet in Fier et fou de vous). On the other hand, his Lux aeterna is written for orchestra, choir and rock band. He has toured several times with transcriptions of his songs for voice and orchestra as well as for voice and piano quintet.

Additionally, he has also written film music (Titanic) and songs or arrangements for other artists (Dalida, Joe Dassin, Barbara... etc.).

The "Introït" from his Lux aeterna (1972) was heavily sampled for the title track from Deltron 3030 (2000), produced by Dan the Automator.

Music

Classical works
1972: Lux aeterna
1977: La sirène ballet for the Paradis Latin
1984: String quartets "Book 1 and 2" by "Quatuor Pasquier"
1985: Suite française
1990: Cello concerto
1992: Symphonie pour un jeune orchestre
1993: Trumpet concerto
1994: Symphonie alternative
1995: Symphonie de poche
1998: Élégies pour violoncelle et orchestre
2003: New recording of the string quartets "Book 1 & 2" + "Les Viennois" by the Parisii Quartet
2004: Symphony in three movements "Sully"
2006: Recording of symphonic works in Ostinato

Albums
1975: Rock'n dollars
1976: Dans un vieux rock'n'roll
1977: Symphoman
1980: Nicolas
1981: J'suis pas bien
1982: Olympia 82 (live)
1983: Simplement
1984: Wiliam Sheller et le quatuor Halvenalf (live)
1986: Univers
1989: Ailleurs
1991: Sheller en solitaire (live)
1993: Le nouveau monde
1994: Albion
1995: Olympiade (live)
2000: Les machines absurdes
2001: Live au Théâtre des Champs-Élysées (live)
2004: Épures
2005: Parade au Cirque Royal (live – filmed concert, available on DVD)
2008: Avatars
2015: Stylus

Singles
1968: "Couleurs"
1968: "Les 4 saisons"
1969: "Adieu Kathy"
1969: "Leslie Simone"
1970: "Living East, Dreaming West"
1970: "She Opened the Door"
1976: "Saint-Exupery Airway"
1976: "Fier et fou de vous"
1976: "J'me gênerai pas pour dire que j't'aime encore"
1976: "La toccatarte" (with Catherine Lara)
1976: "Les petites filles modèles"
1982: "Message urgent"
1982: "Rosanna Banana"
1983: "Chanson lente"
1983: "Les filles de l'aurore"
1983: "Mon Dieu que j'l'aime"
1984: "I keep movin' on"
1991: "Un homme heureux"
1993: "Vienne"
1998: "Centre ville"
2008: "Tout ira bien"

Compilations
1987: Master série
1993: Carnet de notes
1998: Tu devrais chanter
2004: Promenade française
2005: Chemin de traverse (totalling his 30 years of songs)
2016: Préférences (totalling his 40 years of songs)

Film music
1969: Soundtrack from the film Erotissimo
1980: Soundtrack from the film Retour en force
1981: Soundtrack from the film Ma femme s'appelle reviens
1988: Soundtrack from the film Envoyez les violons
1993: Soundtrack from the film L'écrivain public
1997: Soundtrack from the film Arlette

References

External links
 

1946 births
Living people
French male singers
French film score composers
French male film score composers
Philips Records artists